Kentucky County (then alternately spelled Kentucke County) was formed by the Commonwealth of Virginia from the western portion (beyond the Cumberland Mountains) of Fincastle County effective December 31, 1776. The name of the county was taken from a Native American place name that came to be associated with a river in east  central Kentucky, and gave the Kentucky River its name.  During the three and one-half years of Kentucky County's existence, its seat of government was Harrodstown (then also known as Oldtown, later renamed Harrodsburg).

Kentucky County was abolished on June 30, 1780, when it was divided into Fayette, Jefferson, and Lincoln counties. Afterward, these counties and those set off from them later in that decade were designated collectively as the District of Kentucky by the Virginia House of Delegates. The counties of the district frequently petitioned both the Virginia legislature and the Continental Congress seeking statehood. Finally successful, the Commonwealth of Kentucky was admitted to the United States as the 15th state in 1792.

Militia officers
After Kentucky County was legislatively created on December 6, 1776 (effective 1777), the county militia was organized as follows:
George Rogers Clark – Brig General Northwestern Frontier 01/1781
John Bowman – Colonel – County Lieutenant of Kentucky County, Virginia 12/1776 & 11/1779
Anthony Bledsoe – Lieutenant Colonel
John Todd – Captain – Virginia
Benjamin Logan – Captain – Kentucky County, Virginia
Daniel Boone – Captain – Boonesborough, Kentucky
James Harrod – Captain – Harrodsburg, Kentucky

See also
Illinois County, Virginia
History of Kentucky
List of former counties, cities, and towns of Virginia
Trans-Appalachia
Wilderness Road

References

External links
1776 Act to create Kentucky County, Virginia State of Kentucky Secretary of State website

Pre-statehood history of Kentucky
History of Virginia
Former counties of Virginia
1776 establishments in Virginia
1780 disestablishments in Virginia